Jonathan Smith (born 29 January 1955) is a former professional tennis player. He was born in Exeter, England.

Smith enjoyed most of his tennis success while playing doubles.  During his career he won 2 doubles titles. He achieved a career-high doubles ranking of world No. 98 in 1983.

Career finals

Doubles (2 titles, 5 runner-ups)

Local tournaments

Singles (3 title)

External links
 
 

English male tennis players
British male tennis players
Sportspeople from Exeter
1955 births
Living people
Tennis people from Devon